The Office of the International Organization for Migration in London is the diplomatic mission of the International Organisation for Migration in the United Kingdom.

The International Organization for Migration (IOM) has offices in over 100 countries with over 10,000 staff globally. We are committed to the principle that humane and orderly migration benefits migrants and society.

Established in 1951, IOM works with migrants, governments and other partners to provide humane response to the growing migration challenges of today. By promoting international cooperation and dialogue on migration issues, we assist in the search for practical solutions to key issues facing migrants and societies alike.

The United Kingdom joined IOM as a Member State in 1961 and our first liaison office was opened in the United Kingdom in 1992 to support refugee resettlement.  IOM works closely with the UK Government- both in Britain and abroad - to protection migrants from violence, exploitation and abuse (including from modern slavery), and to support safer, orderly and regular migration.

Together, IOM and the UK are working to build a stronger evidence base through data collection, research and analysis and to support local authorities, frontline professionals and others to support migrants, refugees and victims of human trafficking.

References

External links
Official site

Buildings and structures in the City of Westminster
Diplomatic missions in London
Organisations based in the City of Westminster
Victoria, London